Leah Thall-Neuberger (December 17, 1915 in Columbus, Ohio – January 25, 1993), nicknamed Miss Ping, was an American table tennis player. She was ranked the # 3 table tennis player in the world in 1951.

Table tennis career
Her six World Championship medals included a gold medal in the mixed doubles at the 1956 World Table Tennis Championships with Erwin Klein. Her partners for the three bronze medals in the doubles were Davida Hawthorn, Thelma Thall and Peggy Ichkoff respectively.

Neuberger won the United States national championships nine times as a single player, twelve times in doubles, and eight times in mixed doubles. She also won 41 times at the Canadian championships. She served on the Canadian team that travelled to the  People’s Republic of China in 1971 on the Ping-Pong Diplomacy Tour. She also won two English Open titles.

Neuberger competed at the 1969 Maccabiah Games in Israel.

Halls of Fame
Neuberger, who was Jewish, was inducted into the International Jewish Sports Hall of Fame in 1999. She was also a member of the US Table Tennis Hall of Fame.

See also
List of select Jewish table tennis players
 List of table tennis players
 List of World Table Tennis Championships medalists

References

External links
Jewish Sports bio

Sportspeople from Columbus, Ohio
American female table tennis players
1915 births
1993 deaths
Jewish table tennis players
Jewish American sportspeople
Competitors at the 1969 Maccabiah Games
Maccabiah Games competitors for the United States
Maccabiah Games table tennis players
World Table Tennis Championships medalists
20th-century American women
20th-century American people
20th-century American Jews